Years of Refusal is the ninth studio album by English alternative rock singer Morrissey. It was released on 16 February 2009 in the UK by record label Decca and on 17 February 2009 in the US by Lost Highway.

It was the last album completed by producer Jerry Finn before his death. The album is also notable for being the first Morrissey album since Your Arsenal not to feature Alain Whyte on lead guitar, who is permanently replaced by Jesse Tobias.

Recording 

Recording for the album commenced in late November 2007 and ended in late December in Los Angeles at Conway Recording Studios. An additional track for the album was recorded in late May according to drummer Matt Walker. Keyboardist Michael Farrell left the band prior to the album's completion so Morrissey recruited Roger Manning to fill in. Manning previously played on Morrissey's 2004 album You Are the Quarry. Manning had this to say about the recording of the album:

In an interview on BBC Radio 5 Live with Tony Visconti, the producer stated that his new project would be "the next Morrissey album", though that this would not be forthcoming for at least a year. However, in an interview with the BBC News website in October 2007, Morrissey said that the album was already written and ready for a possible Autumn 2008 release. In December, Morrissey signed a new deal with Decca Records, which included a Greatest Hits album and a newly recorded album to follow in Autumn 2008.

It was announced in November 2007 that Jerry Finn, the man behind Morrissey's 2004 album You Are the Quarry, would be producing the new album instead of Tony Visconti. A reason for the change was rumored to be related to Kristeen Young, Morrissey's opening act at the time, and Visconti's supposed involvement.

On 30 May 2008, true-to-you.net posted the following on Morrissey's 2008 album:

Featured tracks "That's How People Grow Up", "All You Need Is Me", "Something Is Squeezing My Skull", "Mama Lay Softly on the Riverbed", "I'm Throwing My Arms Around Paris" and "One Day Goodbye Will Be Farewell" were all debuted on Morrissey's 2007–2008 Greatest Hits tour.

Content 

Of the 12 tracks, current guitarist Boz Boorer wrote four and former guitarist Alain Whyte wrote five. The remaining three tracks are Jesse Tobias compositions. Though he wrote nearly half the songs on the album Whyte did not participate in the recording. Years of Refusal marks the first time since 1992's Your Arsenal that Alain Whyte has not performed on a Morrissey album.

The photo on the album cover for Years of Refusal is a portrait by Jake Walters. The baby pictured with Morrissey is Sebastien Pesel-Browne, who is the son of Charlie Browne, Morrissey's assistant tour manager. Sebastien's mother met Charlie at a Morrissey concert in Boston.

Release 
It was later announced that 23 February 2009 would be the new release date for Years of Refusal. Finally, in a press release from Universal Music it was announced that the final release date for the album would be 16 February 2009 with the first single, "I'm Throwing My Arms Around Paris", preceding the album a week earlier on 9 February 2009.

Years of Refusal reached number 3 in the UK Albums Chart.

Reception 

On 11 December 2008, Morrissey, along with Polydor president Ferdy Unger-Hamilton, unveiled Years of Refusal in London to a select group of journalists with a special listening of the album at Piccadilly's Pigalle Club. First impressions of the album were universally positive.

Early reviews of the album suggested a return to the form of You Are the Quarry, with Clash commenting that it is "in a word, 'brilliant'" and that "it's hard to listen to this album and not conclude that it's one of his best as a solo artist". Tom Ewing of Pitchfork, along with giving the album an 8.1 rating, lauded Years of Refusal highly for its "rejuvenation" of Morrissey:

Q magazine, who gave the album a three star rating, praised and criticized the album saying: "So there is that fabulous voice, the felicitous turn of phrase, the ability to hit universal truths that transcend one middle-aged Mancunian's ingrained sense of being hard-done-by – but there's also too much grudge-bearing, too much self-justification, too much undistinguished guitar thump.

Morrissey has described it as his "strongest work to date".

Track listing 

 Note: Given the CD is a mockup of a vinyl record, the words "shame is the name" appear on the runout grooves.

Special edition DVD
 "Wrestle with Russell" (an interview with Russell Brand)
 "That's How People Grow Up" (performed live on Friday Night with Jonathan Ross)
 "All You Need is Me" (performed live on Later... with Jools Holland)
 "All You Need is Me" (promotional video)

Personnel 

 Morrissey – vocals
 Boz Boorer – guitar
 Jesse Tobias – guitar
 Solomon Walker – bass guitar
 Matt Walker – drums

Additional personnel
 Roger Joseph Manning Jr. – keyboards
 Mark Isham – trumpet on tracks 4, 6 and 8
 Jeff Beck – guitar on track 3
 Michael Farrell – keyboards, accordion, cowbell on track 7
 Kristopher Pooley – backing vocals on tracks 2, 6 and 8
 Kristeen Young – additional vocals on track 7
 Chrissie Hynde – backing vocals on track 14

Technical
 Jerry Finn – production
 Seth Waldmann – engineering
 Jake Walters – front cover photography
 Travis Shinn – sleeve photography (group)

Charts

Certifications

References

External links 
 

2009 albums
Morrissey albums
Albums produced by Jerry Finn